The Cucamonga Service Station is a historic gas and automobile service station located in Rancho Cucamonga, California. Local lore claims it was built in 1915 by Henry Klusman, who built many of the early buildings in Cucamonga, but no documented evidence of this has been yet discovered. The station operated until 1971. In 1926, the historic U.S. Route 66 was organized, and the station sits on the North side of the Route 66. The Cucamonga Service Station was originally one of thousands of similar service stations along the route. Today, it is the only surviving service station of its design on Route 66 in California.

William Harvey was the original owner. He operated the Cucamonga Garage and Cyclery on the lot next door form the present day station. In 1914 he purchased the lot next door and built a larger garage with curb side gas pumps out front. Business must have been good because in November 1915 he purchased the land behind the garage from Henry Klusman, (This may be where the idea that Klusman built the station came from.) The streetside garage was then taken down and rebuilt (probably in 1916) at the back of the lot and given a new facade of a Spanish Colonial style to match the new gas station built in front. After being structurally weakened by a fire, the garage collapsed in 2011 during a heavy storm.

 From the 1930s through the 1960s, it was a Richfield Oil Corporation gas station, owned and operated by Ancil Morris and ceased operation entirely in the early 1970s. The Rancho Cucamonga city council voted in 2009 to make the Cucamonga Service Station a city landmark but that designation did not provide funds for preservation or restoration.

In 2013 the property was owned by Lamar Advertising and when they requested permission to demolish it the city council denied the request informing them of its protection as a city historical landmark. Not being in the business of historic preservation they made a deal with Route 66 Inland Empire California (IECA), a local historic preservation non-profit organization. The property and station were donated to Route 66 IECA with the stipulation that they maintain an easement for access to Lamar's billboard at the edge of the lot. Lamar was able to write off the charitable donation and the station was now owned by someone who could restore it. It was converted into a small museum in 2015.  The station is visited each week by tourists from around the world and across the country as they travel America's Mother Road as well as locals who just want to come in and reminisce.

The restoration was provided by private donations, grants, and volunteer labor and has since won numerous awards and honors.

 2009 - City Landmark designation.
 2015 - Dedication Plaque from the Native Sons of the Golden West.
 2016 - Preservation Design Award from the California Preservation Foundation.
 2018 - Governor's Historic Preservation Award.
 2018 - Listed on the National Register of Historic Places.
 2019 - Best of Rancho Cucamonga - Museum.
 2020 - Route 66 IECA named Non-Profit of the year - Rancho Cucamonga Chamber of Commerce.

Future plans include raising enough funds to rebuild the garage at the back of the lot which will greatly expand the museum space.

References

National Register of Historic Places in California
Gas stations in the United States
Gas stations on the National Register of Historic Places in California